Luxembourg competed at the 2022 World Games held in Birmingham, United States from 7 to 17 July 2022.

Competitors
The following is the list of number of competitors in the Games.

Karate

Luxembourg competed in karate.

References

Nations at the 2022 World Games
World Games
World Games